Enrique Inostroza Aranciba (born 10 July 1921) is a Chilean former long-distance runner. He competed in the marathon at the 1948 Summer Olympics.

References

External links
 

1921 births
Possibly living people
Athletes (track and field) at the 1948 Summer Olympics
Athletes (track and field) at the 1951 Pan American Games
Chilean male long-distance runners
Chilean male marathon runners
Olympic athletes of Chile
Place of birth missing
Pan American Games competitors for Chile